Kim Gak (1536–1610) was a Korean military officer and poet during the Choseon Dynasty. He was born in Sangju.

The poet's life was influenced by the Japanese invasion of 1592. His poetic work is characterized by Confucian ethics and the joy of living.

References

External links
Kim Gak at Encyclopedia of Korean Culture 

16th-century Korean people
People of the Japanese invasions of Korea (1592–1598)
1536 births
1610 deaths
People from Sangju